Lidia may refer to:

 Lidia (given name)
 Lidia (spider), a spider genus
 Hurricane Lidia, multiple storms
 Comoedia Lydiae, a medieval Latin elegiac comedy from the late twelfth century
 Spanish Fighting Bull, also known as toro de lidia, an Iberian heterogenous cattle population

See also
 Lydia (disambiguation)